Belfast is an unincorporated community in Bryan County, Georgia, United States.  It is part of Savannah–Hinesville–Statesboro Combined Statistical Area.

History
A post office called Belfast was established in 1904, and remained in operation until 1916. The community takes its name from Belfast, the largest city in Northern Ireland.

Notes

Unincorporated communities in Bryan County, Georgia
Unincorporated communities in Georgia (U.S. state)